Siege of Corfu may refer to:
 Siege of Corfu (1537) by the Ottoman Turks led by Hayreddin Barbarossa
 Sieges of Corfu 1571 and 1573, see Corfu#Venetian rule and 
Ottoman–Venetian War (1570–1573)
 Siege of Corfu (1716) by the Ottoman Turks
 Siege of Corfu (1798–1799) by a Russian-Turkish fleet led by admiral Fyodor Ushakov

See also 
 Corfu (disambiguation)